Francesco Begnini (born November 12, 1999), better known by his ring name Francesco Akira is an Italian professional wrestler, working for the Japanese promotion New Japan Pro-Wrestling (NJPW), where he is a member of the United Empire stable and a current IWGP Junior Tag Team Champion. Begnini has also wrestled for All Japan Pro-Wrestling (AJPW) where he was a former AJPW Junior Heavyweight Champion.

Professional wrestling career

Early career 
Begnini debuted as a professional wrestler in the Italian wrestling circuit, working for the Italian Championship Wrestling, the promotion where he trained, for the Rising Sun Wrestling Promotion, ASCA Wrestling, and also for Irish and British promotions such as Over the Top Wrestling and Attack! Pro Wrestling.

All Japan Pro Wrestling (2019–2022) 

Begnini made his debut in All Japan Pro Wrestling at AJPW Excite Series 2019 on February 7, where he teamed up with Black Menso-re, Kento Miyahara and Yoshitatsu in a losing effort to Evolution (Hikaru Sato, Suwama and Yusuke Okada). He continued his tenure with the company, working for various events such as AJPW Chiba Extra Dream In Narita on July 15, 2019, where he teamed up with Hikaru Sato, Hokuto Omori and Yusuke Okada to defeat Atsushi Maruyama, Black Menso-re, Keiichi Sato and Koji Iwamoto in an eight-man tag team match.

On the first night of the AJPW New Year Wars 2020 on January 2, where he participated in a 13-man battle royal also involving Jake Lee, Takao Omori, Osamu Nishimura and others.

Begnini is known for competing in the AJPW Junior League. He made his first appearance at the 2019 edition of the event, placing himself in the Block A and scoring a total of two points after competing against Atsushi Maruyama, Yusuke Okada, Tajiri, Kotaro Suzuki and Koji Iwamoto. At the 2021 edition of the event, he came out champion after defeating Tajiri in the first round, Takuya Sugi in the second round, Tatsuhito Takaiwa in the semi-finals and El Lindaman in the finals on June 3, 2021.

Another signature event of the promotion in which Begnini took part is the AJPW Junior Tag League, making his first appearance at the 2019 edition of the event, where he teamed up with Hokuto Omori and scored a total of three points after competing against the teams of Keiichi Sato and Koji Iwamoto, Banana Senga and Tsutomu Oosugi, Atsushi Maruyama and Black Menso～re, Hikaru Sato and Yusuke Okada, and Kagetora and Yosuke♥Santa Maria. At the 2020 edition, he teamed up with Takayuki Ueki and fell short to Jin (Koji Iwamoto and Fuminori Abe) in the first round from December 27.

New Japan Pro-Wrestling (2022–present) 
On March 28, 2022, a video, titled 'BRUCIARE' ("Burn" in Italian) was posted by New Japan Pro-Wrestling which showed United Empire leader Will Ospreay on a unknown location walking over pictures of the junior division wrestlers of New Japan on the floor, declaring the division wasn't the same since he graduated, and that he would rebuild her with a then unknown protegé, that would join him soon. On April 9, Begnini made his NJPW debut at Hyper Battle '22, after the IWGP Junior Heavyweight Championship match, where El Desperado successfully defended his belt against Sho, where Begnini unveiled a United Empire shirt, thus joining the group and announcing he would compete in the Best of the Super Jrs. tournament in May. On May 1, Akira was announced to be competing in the A Block, where he would finish it with a record of 4 wins and 5 losses, finishing with 8 points, therefore failing to advance to the finals. On the finals day, Akira and United Empire stablemate T. J. Perkins defeated IWGP Junior Tag Team Champions Master Wato and Ryusuke Taguchi in a non-title match. On June 20, Akira and Perkins would beat the duo of Taguchi and Wato to win the titles, that being Akira's first championship in NJPW.

Championships and accomplishments
Adriatic Special Combat Academy
ASCA Tag Team Championship (1 time) – with Gravity
All Japan Pro Wrestling
World Junior Heavyweight Championship (1 time)
AJPW Junior League (2021)
Italian Championship Wrestling
ICW Italian Tag Team Championship (1 time) – with Gravity
ICW Cartoomics 24/7 Championship (1 time)
Pro Wrestling Illustrated
Ranked No. 306 of the top 500 singles wrestlers in the PWI 500 in 2021
Rising Sun Wrestling Promotion
Rising Championship (2 times)
New Japan Pro-Wrestling
IWGP Junior Heavyweight Tag Team Championship (1 time, current) – with TJP

References 

1999 births
Living people
21st-century professional wrestlers
Italian male professional wrestlers
IWGP Junior Heavyweight Tag Team Champions
Sportspeople from Bergamo
World Junior Heavyweight Champions (AJPW)